The Taipei Representative Office in Ireland represents the interests of Taiwan in Ireland in the absence of formal diplomatic relations, functioning as a de facto embassy.

The representative office is responsible for promoting bilateral relations between Taiwan and Ireland at various levels such as economy and trade, academics, culture, tourism, science and technology, education, etc., as well as handling consular business such as passports, visas, and document certification, as well as providing services for expatriates and emergencies for foreigners. The office is equivalent to the embassy of the country with diplomatic relations.

History
On 12 July 1988, the Free China Center in Ireland, which functions as an embassy, was established in Dublin. On 2 May 1991, it was renamed the Taipei Economic and Cultural Office in Ireland. On 18 August 1995, it was renamed as Taipei Representative Office in Ireland.

See also
 List of diplomatic missions of Taiwan
 List of diplomatic missions in the Republic of Ireland

References

External links
 Taipei Representative Office in Ireland

Ireland
Taiwan
1988 establishments in Ireland
Diplomatic missions in Dublin (city)
Organizations established in 1988